Carncot Independent School is a coeducational independent day school serving Years 1 to 8.  It is located close to the center of the city of Palmerston North, in the Manawatu District.  New Zealand European make up 70% of the roll, with Māori, Pacific Island, European, South African, Middle, and Far Eastern families represented. The school accepts international students.

History

About 1903, Constance Stanford began taking students for her school, which was located in rooms above William Park's stationery shop on Broadway.  The school moved to several different locations until taking up residence in the Fitzherbert homestead on its present site at 263 Broadway Avenue in 1955.  In 1998, the house was moved forward and a new school built at the back to accommodate an increasing role.  In 2003, a new gymnasium was added.  The old school hall was converted into a music suite and the art gallery was opened in 2009. 

Both boys and girls have attended junior school since the early days, but no boys were enrolled in the last quarter of a century. Until 2013, Carncot was one of a handful of schools offering primary education in a girls-only context.

In late 2012, it was announced that for the first time in 30 years, boys between years 1 and 6 would be able to enrol at the school from 2013.  The school is now fully co-educational from Years 1 to 8.

The school is governed by the Carncot Trust Board.

The staff is composed of a principal, an associate principal, nine classroom teachers, and an administration team of seven staff.

See also
List of schools in New Zealand

References

ERO report (2014)
 http://www.carncot.school.nz

External links

 Schools in Manawatū-Whanganui
 Primary schools in New Zealand